Melanerpeton is an extinct genus of prehistoric amphibian that lived during the Permian approximately 285 million years ago in what would become Europe.

References

Werneburg, R. (2007) Timeless design: colored pattern of skin in early Permian branchiosaurids (Temnospondyli: Dissorophoidea). Journal of Vertebrate Paleontology 27, 1047–1050.
Fossilworks Paleobiological database

Branchiosaurids